Modern Madcaps is an animated film series produced by Paramount Pictures' Famous Studios animation division between the years 1958 and 1967. The series featured assorted characters that later became part of the Harvey Comics library. A total of 65 shorts was produced and released.

List of shorts

List of outsourced shorts

References

External links 

 Modern Madcaps at the Big Cartoon Database

Film series introduced in 1958
Famous Studios series and characters
American animation anthology series
Anthology film series